James Edgar Martine (August 25, 1850February 26, 1925) was an American Democratic Party politician who served as United States Senator from New Jersey.

Biography
He was born in New York City on August 25, 1850. He moved with his parents to Plainfield, New Jersey, in 1857; attended the public schools; engaged in agricultural pursuits, the real estate business, and in building; member of the Plainfield common council; unsuccessful candidate for election as Mayor of Plainfield, New Jersey; unsuccessful candidate in 1906 for election to the Sixtieth United States Congress. He was elected as a Democrat to the United States Senate and served from March 4, 1911, to March 3, 1917, where he served as chairman of the Committee on Coast Defenses (Sixty-third United States Congress), Committee on Industrial Expositions (Sixty-third and Sixty-fourth United States Congresses); unsuccessful candidate for reelection in 1916; resumed agricultural pursuits; died in Miami, Florida; interment in Hillside Cemetery located in Scotch Plains, New Jersey.

During the 1913 Senate Committee investigation into the West Virginia miners strike Senator Martine aggressively confronted Kanawha County coal company executive Quinn Morton for arming and directing the use of the armored "Bull Moose" train against a Holly Grove tent village of miners and their families in the middle of the night on February 2, 1913, during which Charles Estep, young miner with a young child and a pregnant wife, was killed. The train contained dozens of private mercenaries armed with a Gatling gun. Martine confronted Morton over his refusal to acknowledge giving the command to fire and then reportedly asking the sheriff to back the train up and do it again. The two other senators on the committee attempted to censor Martine by requiring that his questions be submitted for prior review. According to historian David Allen Corbin's 1997 book The West Virginia Mine Wars the Congressional Record of this hearing "breaks off suddenly, the topic switches, and Senator Martine disappears from the panel of inquisitors." (p. 39)

He died on February 26, 1925, in Miami, Florida, of apoplexy.

External links

Political Graveyard information for James Edgar Martine

References

1850 births
1925 deaths
Democratic Party United States senators from New Jersey
New Jersey Democrats
Mayors of Plainfield, New Jersey
Burials at Hillside Cemetery (Scotch Plains, New Jersey)